Gharibabad (also Romanized as Gharībābād; also known as Pīreh Gaz and Gharībābād-e Shandak) is a village in Eskelabad Rural District, Nukabad District, Khash County, Sistan and Baluchestan Province, Iran. At the 2006 census, its population was 78, in 22 families.

References 

Populated places in Khash County